The Star Prince (also known as Twinkle Twinkle Little Star) is a 1918 fantasy film directed by Madeline Brandeis and starring Zoe Rae and Dorphia Brown. The film was produced by the Little Players Film Company.

When shown the film as a nonagenarian, Rae dismissed her performance by exclaiming, "What a ham!"

Plot
The film opens with an excerpt from the English lullaby Twinkle, Twinkle, Little Star and continues with a shot of a windmill and the lines once upon a time. One night a woodcutter was making his way home when he sees a star fall from the sky, he goes over to investigate and finds the star prince. The woodcutter brings the star prince home to the rest of his family who hug the star prince. Seven years later the star prince has grown to be a spoiled brat who believes himself to be better than everyone. One morning he makes his siblings help him beat up an old beggar woman but the woodcutter who was chopping down trees in the forest hears what is going on and forces the star prince to stop. The woodcutter brings the beggar woodman inside to give her a drink, She reveals that she is the mother of the star prince and that she has been searching for him for years. The woodcutter sends one of his daughters to tell the star prince, who then rushes in the house only to realize that the beggar woman is his mother. The Star Prince sends her away crying into the forest. A fairy who witnessed what the star prince had done places a curse on him which makes look hideous. When the star prince finds out he is then mocked by his siblings and not recognized. He then goes into the woods to search for his mother to ask for forgiveness. Somewhere in the castle a fairy godmother tells the princess that she will marry a prince who fell from a star which overjoys the princess. While traveling in the woods the prince finds a squirrel who has been trapped, He lets the squirrel free and for his good act the fairy gives him back his beauty. The princess is searching in the woods for her lost dog but rides back to the castle unsuccessful. The star prince finds the dog and chases after the princess. Back at the castle the Princess is grateful for the actions of the star prince. The wicked dwarf watches all of this and tells the prince that he can take him to see the princess.

The dwarf takes him to a cave in hopes of keeping him away for the princess with the help of his mother the Witch. The dwarf then goes to the castle to ask the king to wed his daughter to witch the king agrees. The princess is outraged to find out and that night she realizes that the boy who found her dog was the star prince. She uses a carrier pigeon to send word to the star prince in hopes that he will rescue her. The note reaches the star prince and tells him that if he touches a magic rock in the cave he will be free. The Star Prince dose so and rushes to the castle climbs up the wall and down the chimney while being watched by the spy. The princess is overjoyed to see him but back in the cave he is found to be missing. The witch summons all the imps to find the Star Prince. They climb up the castle wall and down the chimney to the Princess' room. The star prince hides in the closet and when the imps come in they demand that the Princess opens her closet. When she says no they push her away and find the Star Prince. He fights with the dwarf before being picked up and taken away. Back in the cave the Star Prince is forced by the witch to go into the forest and fetch her a bag of gold. On his way he sees a group of fairies but they vanish before he can get to them. A day later he finds the squirrel he once saved, the squirrel offers to find the gold and a little later comes back with it. On his way back to the cave he meets an old beggar who begs for him to give the money. The Star Prince does and enters the cave. Once the witch realises he doesn't have the gold she beats him. That night the Star Prince gets up and makes a daring escape out of the cave. He runs through the enchanted forest. He wanders into the forest so deep. Menacingly skulls hang in the trees. The Star Prince startled and scared falls down the hill. The next morning at the castle the wedding is about to take place and the dwarf is mistaken for the Star Prince. After waking up the Star Prince finds the castle. Meanwhile the witch has a vision of him and rushes to the castle. The Star Prince enters the castle right before the princess says I do during the marriage ceremony to the dwarf and announces who he is. Suddenly outside the castle the witch is killed by castle guards. The dwarf is then changed into a Pig and runs off. The Star Prince tells the Princess that he can't marry her until he finds his mother and asks for forgiveness. Just then his mother arrives along with the old beggar. The Star Prince begs for forgiveness and his mother grants his wish. The fairy godmother bestows gifts of gorgeously tailored outfits. The Fairy godmother explains that the man whom the Star Prince gave the gold to was his father. "Long Live The star Prince and the film ends with the last line from twinkle, twinkle, little star".

Cast
Zoe Rae as The Star Prince
Dorphia Brown as Princess
John Dorland as dwarf
Edith Rothschild as beggar woman
Marjorie Claire Bowden as witch
Gulnar Kheiralla as fairy godmother

References

External links

1910s fantasy films
American fantasy films
American black-and-white films
American silent feature films
Dwarves in popular culture